This House is a play by James Graham. It received its première in the Cottesloe Theatre at the Royal National Theatre from 18 September to 1 December 2012 in a production directed by Jeremy Herrin. In February 2013 it transferred to the larger Olivier Theatre where it continued to play with much critical acclaim to packed houses until May 2013.

The show was revived at the Minerva Theatre, Chichester from 23 September to 29 October 2016 before it received its West End debut at the Garrick Theatre where it ran from 19 November 2016 to 25 February 2017.

A UK tour began on 23 February 2018 at the West Yorkshire Playhouse.

In May 2019 the play was voted Play of the Decade in Bloomsbury Publishing's '60 Years of Modern Plays' public vote.

It derives its title from the name given to the House of Commons by MPs. The action takes place in the period in British parliamentary history between the February 1974 general election and the 1979 vote of no confidence in the government of James Callaghan. The play is set in the Palace of Westminster mainly in the offices of the Labour and Conservative Chief Whips. Party leaders such as Ted Heath, Harold Wilson, James Callaghan, Jeremy Thorpe and Margaret Thatcher remain offstage characters (though Liberal leader David Steel is depicted). The narrative concentrates on the relationships between the two sets of whips (the so-called usual channels), and between the whips, their backbenchers and the members of the minor parties.

Although the play is based on real events, it is neither a documentary nor a biography, but a fictionalised account of a turbulent period in British politics. Conversations are imagined, characters have been changed, incidents added and the time line adjusted.

Summary
This House is based on true events that occurred between 1974 and 1979 in the House of Commons. These years involved very tense periods in Parliament, with the Labour and Conservative whips working hard to defend and remove the Government respectively. The February 1974 election had produced a 'hung parliament' (where no party has a majority to govern and pass laws). This deadlock led to the October 1974 general election, where the incumbent Labour government gained a majority of 1 seat – meaning that whips had to ensure every Labour MP voted whenever the Government needed to win a vote (which might have happened multiple times a day). This situation got more difficult between October 1974 and March 1979 as the Labour government lost MPs in by-elections and defections to other parties. The government was finally defeated in a vote of no confidence – by 1 vote – in March 1979. 

It is the job of parliamentary whips to win votes for their party, by tracking how many of their colleagues are going to vote and convincing (or threatening) reluctant colleagues to vote the way they want. Usually, when one member cannot be present at a division, the whips will attempt to 'pair' them, by striking an informal agreement with the opposition that one of their members will also miss the vote. As happened between 1974 and 1979, throughout the play, these relationships and pairing break down due to the tensions in the government with a small majority, or even none at all. At different times, both parties lost votes in circumstances where they felt that the other party had cheated the pairing (that is, the MP who promised not to vote had voted). Sick members were obliged to attend the House for their votes to be counted, and this was done even in circumstances where this may have contributed to their deaths. It is this tension, and the work it cause the party whips, which the play fictionalises.

MPs
As well as the whips listed below, MPs Audrey Wise and Alfred Broughton appear in the play.

Characters and cast

External links
Official page
Guardian review (Olivier transfer)

References

2012 plays
English political plays
Fiction set in 1974
Fiction set in 1975
Fiction set in 1976
Fiction set in 1977
Fiction set in 1978
Fiction set in 1979
Plays set in the 1970s
Plays by James Graham
Plays set in London
Plays based on real people
Cultural depictions of British prime ministers